The 2019 Tali Open was a professional tennis tournament played on hard courts. It was the first edition of the tournament which was part of the 2019 ATP Challenger Tour. It took place in Helsinki, Finland between November 11 and November 17, 2019.

Singles main-draw entrants

Seeds

 1 Rankings are as of November 4, 2019.

Other entrants
The following players received wildcards into the singles main draw:
  Jonáš Forejtek
  Harri Heliövaara
  Patrik Niklas-Salminen
  Leevi Säätelä
  Otto Virtanen

The following player received entry into the singles main draw using a protected ranking:
  Carlos Gómez-Herrera

The following players received entry into the singles main draw as alternates:
  Gabriel Petit
  David Poljak

The following players received entry from the qualifying draw:
  Jonathan Mridha
  Jaroslav Pospíšil

The following player received entry as a lucky loser:
  Aleksi Löfman

Champions

Singles

 Emil Ruusuvuori def.  Mohamed Safwat 6–3, 6–7(4–7), 6–2.

Doubles

 Frederik Nielsen /  Tim Pütz def.  Tomislav Draganja /  Pavel Kotov 7–6(7–2), 6–0.

References

2019 ATP Challenger Tour
2019 in Finnish sport
November 2019 sports events in Europe